Gustavo Fernández and Nicolas Peifer defeated Gordon Reid and Michaël Jérémiasz in the final, 7–5, 5–7, 6–2 to win the gentlemen's doubles wheelchair tennis title at the 2015 Wimbledon Championships.

Stéphane Houdet and Shingo Kunieda were the defending champions, but were defeated by Fernández and Peifer in the semifinals.

Seeds

  Stéphane Houdet /  Shingo Kunieda (semifinals)
  Gordon Reid /  Michaël Jeremiasz (final)

Draw

Finals

References
Draw

Men's Wheelchair Doubles
Wimbledon Championship by year – Wheelchair men's doubles